Katie Geneva Cannon (January 3, 1950 – August 8, 2018) was an American Christian theologian and ethicist associated with womanist theology and black theology. In 1974 she became the first African-American woman ordained in the United Presbyterian Church (USA).

Early life 
Born on January 3, 1950, Cannon spent her childhood in Kannapolis, North Carolina, a racially segregated community where she could not use local facilities such as the YMCA, swimming pool or library.  She was the daughter of the late Esau Cannon and Corine L. Cannon, the first woman to work at the Cannon Mills in Kannapolis. Both her parents were elders in the Presbyterian Church. She had six brothers and sisters.

Education and Career 
Cannon graduated with a Bachelor of Science degree from Barber–Scotia College, followed by a Master of Divinity from Johnson C. Smith Theological Seminary, and master's and Doctor of Philosophy degrees from Union Theological Seminary in New York.

Cannon was ordained on April 24, 1974, in Shelby, North Carolina, by the Catawba Presbytery, in the Synod of Catawba, becoming the first African-American woman to be ordained in the United Presbyterian Church (USA). Cannon worked at Ascension Presbyterian Church in East Harlem, New York.

Cannon began teaching at Union Presbyterian Seminary in Richmond in 2001. She held the position of the Annie Scales Rogers Professor of Christian Social Ethics. Prior to joining the faculty at Union Presbyterian Seminary, Cannon was on the faculties of Temple University, Episcopal Divinity School, and Harvard Divinity School. She was also the Lilly Distinguished Visiting Professor of Religion at Davidson College and the Sterling Brown Visiting Professor in Religion and African American Studies at Williams College.

In addition to her breaking ground as an African American woman scholar of religion, Cannon collaborated with African women scholars of religion, including Mercy Amba Oduyoye. Cannon was one of few African American women present at the founding meeting of the Circle of Concerned African Women Theologians.

In 2012, Cannon began serving as executive director of the Squaring the Womanist Circle Project at Union Presbyterian Seminary. Following from the research results produced by the project, Cannon worked with the administration of Union Presbyterian Seminary and several foundations to establish The Center For Womanist Leadership at Union Presbyterian Seminary. The center is the first of its kind at any theological academic institution in the United States. From 2004 to 2008, she served as president of the Society for the Study of Black Religion.

Cannon received the distinguished professor award from Spelman College, the Lucy Craft Laney Award at the Black Presbyterian Bicentennial Celebration, and was a professor-scholar honoree at the National Black Church Summit at Emory University. She received the  Beautiful Are The Feet Award from the Samuel DeWitt Proctor Conference. The American Academy of Religion honored Cannon with its 2011 Excellence in Teaching Award. In 2018, Cannon was honored at the Presbyterian Church (USA)'s General Assembly, receiving the Excellence in Theological Education Award.

As her last living testament, Cannon founded and organized the Center for Womanist Leadership at Union Presbyterian Seminary in April 2018, which was later endowed and renamed The Katie Geneva Cannon Center for Womanist Leadership. Cannon died on August 8, 2018.

Influence on Womanist Theology and Ethics 
Cannon is widely regarded as one of the founders of womanist theology and ethics. In reflecting on her legacy, scholar Traci C. West notes Cannon's emphasis on using black women's embodied knowledge as a source for ethical reflection. In her analytical approach, one finds a sharp conceptualization of both the strength and vulnerability of black women especially evident in their collisions with white supremacy. Katie Cannon's scholarship reveals the ugliness of white racism and how it preys on black women's human vulnerabilities. To reveal the ugliness demands courage because it is so painful. The reflective process of unravelling the impact of racist patterns, as well as the commitment to remaining focused on them and inviting others to do so too, requires scholarly and spiritual stamina. Katie Cannon's work provides us with historically rooted, geopolitically situated, and intimate examples of black women's epistemological strength. She depicts black women's embodied knowledge as a creative force. The task of the womanist ethicist, she insisted, is to uncover and comprehend it.Cannon's first full-length book, Black Womanist Ethics, published in 1988, was a groundbreaking text, and is considered to have launched the field of womanist ethics.

Publications 
God's Fierce Whimsy: The Implications of Feminism for Theological Education. Pilgrim Press, 1985
Inheriting Our Mothers' Gardens: Feminist Theology in Third World Perspective. Letty M. Russell,  Ada Maria Isasi-Diaz, Kwok Pui-lan, and Katie Geneva Cannon, editors. Westminster John Knox Press, 1988. .
 Katie's Canon: Womanism and the Soul of the Black Community. Continuum, 1998. .
Published in 1998 by the Continuum International Publishing Group, Cannon argues the importance of womanism from a religious, literary and political perspective. Through a series of essays, Cannon continually reviews the role that gender, race and class have held in the formation of black feminist consciousness.  Through looking at the intersection between African American women's lived experience of oppression, and faith, Cannon explains  how African American women  how found themselves in a position of moral guides not just in the African American tradition but also America.
Black Womanist Ethics, Oxford University Press, 1988
Teaching Preaching: Isaac Rufus Clark and Black Sacred Rhetoric. Continuum, 2007. .
 Womanist Theological Ethics: A Reader. Katie Geneva Cannon, Emilie M. Townes, and Angela D. Sims, editors. Westminster John Knox Press, 2011. .
The Oxford Handbook of African American Theology, Oxford University Press, 2014
 Katie's Canon: Womanism and the Soul of the Black Community, 25th Anniversary Revised and Expanded Edition. Fortress, 2021. .

References

External links 

1950 births
2018 deaths
African-American theologians
African-American Christians
American women academics
American Christian theologians
Presbyterian Church (USA) teaching elders
Barber–Scotia College alumni
Interdenominational Theological Center alumni
Union Presbyterian Seminary faculty
Union Theological Seminary (New York City) alumni
Womanist theologians
Womanist writers
People from Kannapolis, North Carolina
Temple University faculty
Episcopal Divinity School faculty
Harvard Divinity School faculty
American women non-fiction writers
20th-century African-American people
21st-century African-American people
20th-century African-American women
21st-century African-American women
African-American women writers